The Battle of Cuddalore refers to one of several conflicts near the south Indian town of Cuddalore:

 Siege of Cuddalore (1746), an action during the First Carnatic War (part of the War of the Austrian Succession) 
 Battle of Cuddalore (1758), an indecisive naval battle during the Third Carnatic War (part of the Seven Years' War)
 Siege of Cuddalore, a 1783 siege during the Second Anglo-Mysore War (part of the Anglo-French War of 1778–1783) 
 Battle of Cuddalore (1783), a naval battle that occurred during the siege